Verkh-Zhilino is a rural locality (a selo) and the administrative center of Verkh-Zhilino Selsoviet of Kosikhinsky District, Altai Krai, Russia. The population was 410 as of 2016. There are  13 streets.

Geography 
Verkh-Zhilino is located om the Zhilikha River, 17 km north of Kosikha (the district's administrative centre) by road. Kosikha is the nearest rural locality.

References 

Rural localities in Kosikhinsky District